Brachysybra is a genus of beetles in the family Cerambycidae, containing the following species:

 Brachysybra elliptica Breuning, 1940
 Brachysybra unicolor Breuning, 1957

References

Apomecynini
Cerambycidae genera